John McCammon, of Belfast, developed an early safety bicycle in 1884. It had a step-through frame.

References

Engineers from Belfast
Irish inventors
19th-century Irish businesspeople